Schoolies can mean:

Schoolies week, the Australian high-school graduate tradition.
Skoolies or sometimes Schoolies, people who convert school buses into recreational vehicles (or the vehicles themselves).

See also
 Schooley (disambiguation)
 School (disambiguation)